The Franklin Downtown Commercial District, in Franklin, Kentucky, is a historic district which was listed on the National Register of Historic Places in 1983.  The listing was expanded later in the same year.

The original listing included 50 contributing buildings, including the Simpson County Courthouse which was already separately listed on the National Register.

The increase added four contributing buildings:
the Dr. J.C. Douglas House (c.1850-1875), an Italianate I-house built with common bond brick
the Southern Kentucky Sanatorium (c.1900) and Annex (1912), post-Victorian structures, and
the Grainger Apartments (1927), a Georgian Revival structure.

References

Historic districts on the National Register of Historic Places in Kentucky
National Register of Historic Places in Simpson County, Kentucky
Italianate architecture in Kentucky
Colonial Revival architecture in Kentucky
Franklin, Kentucky